Ukraine has participated in the Junior Eurovision Song Contest since 2006. Ukrainian public broadcaster UA:PBC, has been responsible for the participation. Ukraine won the Junior Eurovision Song Contest 2012 with the song "Nebo" performed by Anastasiya Petryk. Her sister, Viktoria Petryk, reached 2nd place at the Junior Eurovision Song Contest 2008 with "Matrosy".

On 30 November 2013, Ukraine once again hosted the competition, this time at Palace "Ukraine" in Kyiv.

On 2 July 2018, UA:PBC initially announced that they would not take part in the  contest in Minsk, Belarus due to financial difficulties. However, on 2 August 2018, the European Broadcasting Union (EBU) announced that UA:PBC would participate in 2018.

Participation overview

Photo gallery

Commentators and spokespersons

The contests are broadcast online worldwide through the official Junior Eurovision Song Contest website junioreurovision.tv and YouTube. In 2015, the online broadcasts featured commentary in English by junioreurovision.tv editor Luke Fisher and 2011 Bulgarian Junior Eurovision Song Contest entrant Ivan Ivanov. The Ukrainian broadcaster sent their own commentators to the contest in order to provide commentary in the Ukrainian language. Spokespersons were also chosen by the national broadcaster in order to announce the awarding points from Ukraine. The table below list the details of each commentator and spokesperson since 2005.

Hostings

See also 
Ukraine in the Eurovision Dance Contest – Dance version of the Eurovision Song Contest.
Ukraine in the Eurovision Song Contest – Senior version of the Junior Eurovision Song Contest.
Ukraine in the Eurovision Young Dancers – A competition organised by the EBU for younger dancers aged between 16 and 21.
Ukraine in the Eurovision Young Musicians – A competition organised by the EBU for musicians aged 18 years and younger.
Ukraine in the Türkvizyon Song Contest – A contest for countries and regions which are of Turkic-speaking or Turkic ethnicity.

References

 
Countries in the Junior Eurovision Song Contest